Iván Pozo (born 26 August 1979, Vigo, Spain) is a retired Spanish professional boxer. Pozo is a former EBU European Flyweight champion and former WBO Inter-Continental Flyweight champion. He currently fights at bantamweight and defended his WBC Mundo Hispano title by defeating Adonis Rivas by unanimous decision on March 4, 2011.

References

1979 births
Flyweight boxers
Living people
Spanish male boxers
20th-century Spanish people
21st-century Spanish people